Nassim Chadli (born 28 July 2001) is a professional footballer who plays as a winger for Ligue 2 club Le Havre. Born in France, he represents Morocco internationally.

Club career
Chadli made his professional debut with Nîmes Olympique in a 3–1 Coupe de France loss to Nice on 10 February 2021. On 4 May 2021, he was offered his first professional contract by Nîmes.

On 29 July 2022, Chadli was loaned to Lommel in Belgium.

In January 2023, Chadli joined Ligue 2 club Le Havre on a two-and-a-half year contract.

International career
Born in France, Chadli is of Moroccan descent. He was called up to represent the  Morocco U20s in a pair of friendlies in October 2020.

Personal life
Chadli is the nephew of the Moroccan international footballer Khalid Boutaïb.

References

External links
 

2001 births
Living people
People from Bagnols-sur-Cèze
Sportspeople from Gard
Footballers from Occitania (administrative region)
Moroccan footballers
Morocco youth international footballers
French footballers
French sportspeople of Moroccan descent
Association football forwards
Nîmes Olympique players
ES Troyes AC players
Lommel S.K. players
Le Havre AC players
Ligue 1 players
Championnat National 2 players
Championnat National 3 players
Challenger Pro League players
Moroccan expatriate footballers
Expatriate footballers in Belgium
Moroccan expatriate sportspeople in Belgium